is a Japanese football player who plays for Shimizu S-Pulse.

Playing career
Nishibe was born in Kobe on 1 December 1980. After graduating from high school, he joined J1 League club Urawa Reds in 1999. Reds was relegated to J2 League from 2000. Although he debuted against Kawasaki Frontale in 2000 J.League Cup on April 12, Reds lost 0–3. He debuted in J2 League on October 7 and played all last 7 matches in 2000 season after the debut. Reds also won the 2nd place and was returned to J1 from 2001. In 2001, he battled with Tomoyasu Ando for the position and played many matches. However he could not play at all in the match behind Norihiro Yamagishi from summer 2002.

In June 2003, Nishibe moved to Kashima Antlers. However he could not play at all in the match behind Hitoshi Sogahata.

In 2004, Nisihbe moved to Shimizu S-Pulse. He became a regular goalkeeper and played many matches for a long time. S-Pulse won the 2nd place in 2005 Emperor's Cup, 2008 J.League Cup and 2010 Emperor's Cup.

In 2011, Nishibe moved to newly was relegated to J2 club, Shonan Bellmare. Although he played as regular goalkeeper, the club results were bad and finished at the 14th place.

In 2012, Nishibe moved to J1 club Kawasaki Frontale. He battled with Rikihiro Sugiyama for the position and played many matches until 2014. However his opportunity to play decreased behind Shota Arai in 2015.

In 2016, Nishibe re-joined newly was relegated to J2 club, Shimizu S-Pulse for the first time in 6 years.

Club statistics

References

External links

Profile at Shimizu S-Pulse

1980 births
Living people
Association football people from Hyōgo Prefecture
Japanese footballers
J1 League players
J2 League players
Urawa Red Diamonds players
Kashima Antlers players
Shimizu S-Pulse players
Shonan Bellmare players
Kawasaki Frontale players
Association football goalkeepers